Hugo Theodor Christoph (16 April 1831 – 5 November 1894) was a German and Russian entomologist.

Born in Herrnhut in Saxony, Hugo Theodor Christoph moved to Russia in 1858. He became a member of the Russian Entomological Society in 1861. From 1880, he was curator of the Lepidoptera collection of Grand Duke Nicholas Mikhailovich of Russia.

His own collection was sold to Thomas de Grey, 6th Baron Walsingham, a member of the Royal Entomological Society, and it is now in the Natural History Museum in London.

References
Anon 1895 Entomologist's Monthly Magazine 31:30

Russian entomologists
German lepidopterists
1831 births
1894 deaths
Biologists from the Russian Empire
People from Herrnhut
19th-century German zoologists
19th-century scientists from the Russian Empire